Langesjøen is a lake in the municipality of Nore og Uvdal in Viken county, Norway. Langesjøen is located ln Hardangervidda. Djupa flows out of Langesjøen to form part of the Numedalslågen watershed (Numedalsvassdraget).

See also
List of lakes in Norway

References

Lakes of Viken (county)